Gryphia (minor planet designation: 496 Gryphia) is an S-type asteroid belonging to the Flora family in the Main Belt. Its diameter is about 15 km and it has an albedo of 0.168.

This object has a very low rate of spin, requiring  to complete a full rotation.

References

External links
 
 

Flora asteroids
Gryphia
Gryphia
Slow rotating minor planets
S-type asteroids (Tholen)
S-type asteroids (SMASS)
19021025